"Marry Me a Little" is a song from the 1970 musical Company, with music and lyrics by Stephen Sondheim.

Marry Me a Little may also refer to:

Marry Me A Little (musical), a 1980 Off-Off-Broadway musical of songs by Sondheim
"Marry Me A Little" (Will & Grace episode), a 2002 episode of television show Will & Grace
"Marry Me a Little" (Desperate Housewives), a 2009 episode from the 5th Season of Desperate Housewives

See also
Marry Me (disambiguation)